The 1949–50 Norwegian 1. Divisjon season was the 11th season of ice hockey in Norway. Eight team participated in the league, and Gamlebyen won the championship.

Regular season

External links 
 Norwegian Ice Hockey Federation 

Norra
GET-ligaen seasons
1949–50 in Norwegian ice hockey